Metroville is a neighborhood in the Karachi West district of Karachi, Pakistan. It was previously administered as part of the SITE Town borough, which was disbanded in 2011.

Foundition by Zulfiqar Ali Bhutto (Late) founding chairman of Pakistan Peoples Party. There are several ethnic groups in Metroville including Pakhtuns, Hazarewal, Punjabis, Sindhis, Kashmiris, Seraikis, Balochis, and Tadjiks etc. Over 99% of the population is Muslim.

Political parties
 Pakistan Muslim League (Nawaz)
 Pakistan Peoples Party
 Pakistan Tehreek-e-Insaf
 Jamat-e-Islami Pakistan

Islamic political parties

 Jamaat-e-Islami
 Jamiat Ulema-e-Islam

Student wings of political parties

 Pukhtoon Students ederation
 Islami Jamiat-e-Talaba
 Peoples Students Federation
 Insaf Students Feseration

References

External links 
 Karachi website
 Local Government Sindh

Neighbourhoods of Karachi
SITE Town